was a Japanese politician. He was born in Yamagata Prefecture. He was the son-in-law of Tokonami Takejirō. He was governor of Nara Prefecture (1923-1926), Gifu Prefecture (1926-1927), Yamanashi Prefecture (1927-1929), Nagano Prefecture (1929-1931), Nagasaki Prefecture (1931-1935) and Kyoto Prefecture (1935-1936). He was a member of the Government-General of Taiwan.

References

Bibliography
Ueda Masaaki他『Japan人名大辞典』講談社、2001.
Successive governor編纂会編『新編Japanのsuccessive governor』successive governor編纂会、1991.
Ikuhiko Hata編『Comprehensive Encyclopedia of the Japanese Bureaucracy：1868 - 2000』University of Tokyo Press、2001.
『山梨Encyclopedia』増補改訂版、山梨日日新聞社、1989.
1884 births
1958 deaths
People from Yamagata Prefecture
Governors of Nara Prefecture
Governors of Gifu Prefecture
Governors of Yamanashi Prefecture
Governors of Nagano
Governors of Nagasaki Prefecture 
Governors of Kyoto
Japanese Home Ministry government officials
Japanese Police Bureau government officials
Members of the Government-General of Taiwan